The 1999 3 Nations Cup was the fourth playing of the annual women's ice hockey tournament. It was held in Montreal and Sherbrooke, Quebec, from November 28 until December 5, 1999.

Results

Preliminary round

Gold medal game

Statistics

Final standings

External links
Tournament on hockeyarchives.info

1999
1999–2000 in American women's ice hockey
1999–2000 in Finnish ice hockey
1999–2000 in Canadian women's ice hockey
1999–2000
Sport in Sherbrooke
Ice hockey competitions in Montreal
1999–2000 in women's ice hockey
November 1999 sports events in Canada
December 1999 sports events in Canada
1999 in Quebec